Dazzle Ships is the fourth studio album by English electronic band Orchestral Manoeuvres in the Dark (OMD), released on 4 March 1983 by Virgin Records (under the guise of the fictitious Telegraph label). Its title and cover art allude to a painting by Vorticist artist Edward Wadsworth based on dazzle camouflage, titled Dazzle-ships in Drydock at Liverpool.

The follow-up album to OMD's commercially successful Architecture & Morality (1981), Dazzle Ships marked a departure in sound for the group, who contended with writer's block and record company pressure to duplicate their previous release. The album is noted for its experimental content, particularly musique concrète sound collages, and the use of shortwave radio recordings to explore Cold War and Eastern Bloc themes. It also concerns itself with the rise of technology in society. The record spawned two singles: "Genetic Engineering" and "Telegraph".

Dazzle Ships met with largely negative reviews and, despite reaching the top five of the UK Albums Chart, was regarded as a commercial flop; it nevertheless attracted a cult following and served as an inspiration for multiple recording artists. Music journalists eventually came to recognise the album as an underrated and misunderstood work, and a record ahead of its time. Since its re-release in 2008, Dazzle Ships has received critical acclaim.

Background

In the year following the release of commercially successful predecessor Architecture & Morality (1981), co-founder and keyboardist Paul Humphreys had married, and he and singer Andy McCluskey were growing apart. The pair had never expected the success they had achieved, and elected to retire OMD, having purchased their first cars and homes in Wirral. McCluskey said, "After two solid years of work... we had written our final epitaph – ["Maid of Orleans" B-side] "Of All the Things We've Made" – and didn't think we'd ever work together again. And all of a sudden, we were quite rich." However, Humphreys and McCluskey – who had delivered only three of their seven contracted albums for Dindisc – felt a debt to their fanbase, and began discussing new musical ideas.

Virgin Records, who had assumed OMD's contract following the collapse of independent subsidiary Dindisc, attempted to influence the sound of the album. Humphreys told how the label tried to sway the band towards duplicating Architecture & Morality, while assuring them they would become "the next Genesis"; this compelled the group to change musical direction. OMD were daunted by the pressure of matching the success of their previous release, and early sessions were not fruitful. Seeking refuge in their radio experiments of old, Humphreys and McCluskey came up with the sound collages "Dazzle Ships" and "Radio Prague". Paradoxically, in light of the eventual critical reaction to Dazzle Ships, the more experimental direction taken on the record was partly a response to muted reviews of Architecture & Morality, which "forced [OMD] into new areas".

At the band's Gramophone Suite studio in Liverpool, they reshuffled their inventory of instruments, introducing the E-mu Emulator. Experiencing writer's block, Humphreys and McCluskey moved to California for six weeks to live with the parents of Humphreys' wife. Upon returning to Liverpool, however, the pair had failed to produce any substantial ideas for the album. They elected to exhume "Of All the Things We've Made" for inclusion, feeling it had been squandered as a B-side, and resurrected "Radio Waves", a holdover from OMD precursor group the Id (this track was considered as a single). "The Romance of the Telescope (Unfinished)", which had appeared as a B-side to 1981's "Joan of Arc", was remixed and the "unfinished" caveat removed. Instrumentalists Martin Cooper and Malcolm Holmes grew dejected by the largely unproductive recording sessions, with Holmes stating, "This was the first time that OMD had reached a major stumbling block."

The band were encouraged by critics to become more political. As such, they used shortwave radio recordings to explore Cold War and Eastern Bloc themes, while oscillating between moody pop music and experimental, musique concrète-influenced soundscapes. "Radio Prague" features the interval signal of the Czechoslovak Radio foreign service, including the time signal and station identification spoken in Czech. "Time Zones" is a montage of various speaking clocks from around the world. Neither "Radio Prague" nor "Time Zones" carry a writing credit, with OMD being credited only for arranging the tracks. "This Is Helena", "ABC Auto-Industry" and "International" also include parts of broadcasts recorded off the air (a presenter introducing herself, an economic bulletin, and news, respectively). The record also explores the pros and cons of the rise of technology in society.

For a time the group sought inspiration in a new studio, Phil Manzanera's White House (latter Gallery Studios) in Chertsey, and hired producer Rhett Davies. McCluskey said, "We intimidated [Davies] in the end. The songs were simply not up his street. They weren't conducive to being handled with slick touches and it ended up with arguments." This did little to help band morale, as Holmes explained, "Both myself and Martin seriously began to doubt Paul and Andy's judgement... More and more, it was becoming Andy's album." The sample-based approach to compiling the tracks further alienated Cooper and Holmes; the latter would ultimately play on only three songs, which had been recorded during the earlier Gramophone Suite sessions. Holmes spent his time at the White House "playing video games and trying to convince [him]self that Paul and Andy knew what they were doing." Part of the album was also recorded at Mayfair Studios in London. McCluskey has cited Kraftwerk's Radio-Activity (1975) as a key influence on the record.

To maintain the band's image of being signed to an indie label, Dazzle Ships purported to have been issued by the fictitious "Telegraph" label. It was released on LP, compact cassette and compact disc. The cover art was created by longtime OMD collaborator Peter Saville; Dazzle-ships in Drydock at Liverpool, the painting which inspired the album's title and artwork, is in the collection of the National Gallery of Canada in Ottawa.

Commercial performance
Dazzle Ships peaked at number five on the UK Albums Chart (remaining in the top 20 for six weeks), and also reached the top-10 in New Zealand and Spain. The record achieved global sales of 300,000 copies; this figure represented a fraction of the sales of multi-million selling predecessor Architecture & Morality (1981), and prompted OMD to move in a more conservative musical direction on subsequent releases. NMEs Gary Ryan noted that the album "was considered a flop", while McCluskey recalled, "The painful joke at Virgin was that it shipped gold and returned platinum."

Critical reception

Dazzle Ships received mostly negative reviews, with NME and other outlets making unfavourable comparisons to the work of OMD heroes Kraftwerk. A scathing Mark Moses in The Boston Phoenix rechristened the album "Guzzle Shit by Offensive Manure in the Park". Record Mirrors Jim Reid observed a "nightmarish" album "replete with the worst kind of futuristic nonsense", while John Gill of Time Out labelled it "redundant avant-garde trickery". Sun Times critic Michael Lawson dismissed the record's experimental content as filler, adding that "too much attention [is] given to soundtrack-like effects that only clutter what decent electropop baubles there are here." There were sporadic appeals for listener perseverance: Paul Colbert of Melody Maker portrayed the album as "a challenge and a reward", while Smash Hits reviewer Johnny Black argued that "the songs are waiting to be found and are as melodic, passionate and vital as ever."

Although a critical and commercial disappointment upon release, Dazzle Ships came to be seen as a noble failure. It was endorsed by Mojo as a "buried treasure" and an "ignored masterwork", while Ned Raggett of AllMusic wrote that the "dazzling" record "beats Kraftwerk at their own game, science and the future turned into surprisingly warm, evocative songs." In The Rough Guide to Rock (1996), co-author Dave Castle said of Dazzle Ships, "This austere evocation of modern alienation is the classic OMD album. Excellent use of samples and incredible synths on strong, melodic and above all highly intelligent pop music." Trouser Press remained unconvinced, describing the record as "impressive but not satisfying". The magazine noted "some amazing sounds and a powerful atmosphere", but felt that "found-tape gimmickry" had taken precedent over songwriting.

Dazzle Ships met with critical acclaim upon its re-release in 2008. Tom Ewing of Pitchfork wrote, "Luckily, you don't need a contrarian streak to love it... history has done its own remix job on Dazzle Ships, and the result is a richer, more unified album than anyone in 1983 could have imagined." In a five-star review, Record Collectors Daryl Easlea observed "consistently eccentric" and "dark and detailed" content, calling the album "a weirdly satisfying listen". Luke Turner of The Quietus asserted, "It stands the test of time as a heroic statement... Dazzle Ships was a fine realisation of that desire to be both pop and important that OMD first hinted at with 'Enola Gay' and 'Electricity'." The record has been routinely hailed as a "masterpiece" in the press.

Legacy

Critics have recognised Dazzle Ships as an underrated and misunderstood work, and a record ahead of its time. John Bergstrom of PopMatters argued that while positive reappraisals of flop albums had become "all-too-common", the "prescient" Dazzle Ships lived up to the hype. Quietus writer Stuart Huggett charted the record's journey "from 1983 release to 2016 Classic Album", stating that it features some of the band's strongest work but is "likely to remain too off the wall ever to permanently join the general public's Classic Albums canon". Dazzle Ships has nevertheless maintained a cult following, and has appeared in The A.V. Clubs "Hall of Fame", the Chicago Tribunes "10 Essential New Wave Albums", and music journalist Paul Roland's "Ten Essential CDs" of the 1980s, among other distinctions.

Fact described the record as a "seminal 1980s LP", while Ian Wade of The Quietus called it "deeply influential". Saint Etienne have cited it as a major inspiration, particularly on their 1991 album, Foxbase Alpha. Founding member, music critic Bob Stanley, noted that Dazzle Ships came to be "accepted as a great record". It has also influenced artists including Death Cab for Cutie, Moby, Future Islands, Anohni, and Telekinesis, who declared Dazzle Ships a "genius" album. It was identified by Death Cab for Cutie's Chris Walla as the record that "everyone points to as [OMD's] magnum opus. It's really a gorgeous album. It's daring and it's weird and it leans a lot on the paranoia of the Cold War."

Some artists have borrowed directly from Dazzle Ships in their writing and performance. Arcade Fire orchestrator Owen Pallett arranged an encore of songs from the album for a 2006 tour, and commented, "There have been certain records in my life that I feel have saved me. Saved my life... records that sound unique or try some new form of human expression. Records like Orchestral Manoeuvres in the Dark's Dazzle Ships." Rapper Kid Cudi sampled "ABC Auto-Industry" on his 2009 track, "Simple As...", and Another Sunny Day and Eggs each released a cover of "Genetic Engineering" as a single. Singer-songwriter Anton Barbeau referenced the album with his electronic piece "Slash Zed Zip", whose title is an anagram of "Dazzle Ships".

The album has received further endorsements from Liars' Angus Andrew, Animal Collective, Amanda "MNDR" Warner, physicist and musician Brian Cox, and producer Mark Ronson, who said, "I was just completely floored... It's just so elegant but a bit lo-fi at the same time." Andrew named Dazzle Ships as one of his favourite records, describing it as "such a cohesive statement, portraying a bleak and lonely environment of a different sort." He added, "It's such an incredible feat to feature experiments like 'Dazzle Ships, Pts. 1-3' [sic], and have them... enhance an album with more straight forward tracks like 'Telegraph'." Novelist and visual artist Douglas Coupland listed it among his 12 "must-have" records, stating, "Dazzle Ships is amazing. It's like a love letter to machines. Like caraway seeds or hot mustard, it's an acquired taste."

Band response
After the release of Dazzle Ships, the band came to view the record as a creative mis-step. Humphreys lamented that "the good songs on it were lost in the overall presentation aspect." McCluskey assumed much of the responsibility, saying, "When the ideas man ran out of ideas, there was nothing left for the melody man [Humphreys] to work on." OMD manager Gordian Troeller expressed regret over not insisting the album be re-recorded. He said, "I didn't fight, Virgin didn't either... I think some of the misgivings Paul felt about the work at the time were too easily overriden by Andy."

Following the record's critical revaluation, the group began to view it more favourably. McCluskey remarked, "The album that almost completely killed our career seems to have become a work of dysfunctional genius... it's taken Paul [Humphreys] 25 years to forgive me for Dazzle Ships. But some people always hold it up as what we were all about, why they thought we were great." Humphreys later said, "When we re-released it a few years ago we got five-star reviews... so perhaps it was just a bit ahead of its time. I know fans still cite it as their favourite [OMD] record." Both men have since named Dazzle Ships as their favourite of the band's albums (along with 1981's Architecture & Morality and 2017's The Punishment of Luxury), and have ranked "The Romance of the Telescope" as their favourite OMD song.

Track listing
Label copy credits: All songs written and/or arranged by Orchestral Manoeuvres in the Dark (except "Radio Waves", by OMD/Floyd).
Writing credits below from ASCAP database.

The "Manor Version" of "Telegraph" was recorded at the same time as Architecture & Morality. "Swiss Radio International" was dropped from the album at the last minute. Like "Radio Prague", it contains the call sign for a radio station and was once referred to as "The Ice Cream Song" by drummer Mal Holmes due to its similarity to the melodies played by ice cream vans. Another version entitled "Radio Swiss International" was included on the Unreleased Archive Vol.1 disc, included in the Souvenir, 40th anniversary box set issued in 2019. The disc also featured further demos entitled "Violin Piece" "SMPTE" and "Guitar Thrash", all dating back to the 1982/83 recording sessions.

A new 40th anniversary release of Dazzle Ships, featuring further bonus demos and rarities, was announced on 02 February 2023, with a release date set for 31 March.

Personnel
 Andy McCluskey – vocals, guitar, bass, keyboards, synthesizers
 Paul Humphreys – keyboards, synthesizers, vocals, percussion
 Martin Cooper – keyboards, synthesizers
 Malcolm Holmes – drums, percussion

Production details
 Recorded at The Gramophone Suite, Gallery Studio and Mayfair Studio
 Mixed at The Manor Studio
 Engineered by Orchestral Manoeuvres in the Dark, Rhett Davies, Ian Little, Keith Richard Nixon, Brian Tench
 Produced by Orchestral Manoeuvres in the Dark and Rhett Davies
 Mastered at The Master Room by Arun Chakraverty
 Designed by M. Garrett, K. Kennedy, P. Pennington, Peter Saville, and Brett Wickens for Peter Saville Associates.

Instruments
In terms of instrumentation, Dazzle Ships saw the band begin to explore digital sampling keyboards (the E-mu Emulator) in addition to their continued use of analogue synthesizers and the Mellotron.

List of used instruments:

 Roland Drumatix Rhythm Unit
 Eko Rythmaker
 Korg MS-20
 Roland SH09
 Roland SH2
 E-mu Emulator I
 Novatron
 Sequential Circuits Prophet 5
 Oberheim OB-X
 Solina String Machine
 Vox Organ

 Toy Piano
 Rainbow Organ
 Piano
 Gretsch Drums
 Ludwig Drums
 Premier Military Bass Drum
 Hammer Bass Block Guitar
 Fender Jazz Bass
 Speak & Spell Machine
 Sanyo Short Wave Radio
 Typewriter

Charts

Weekly charts

Year-end charts

Certifications

Notes

References

External links
 Album lyrics
  Written in Sand – A Dazzle Ships Retrospective
 Clash Magazine – Andy McCluskey interview by John O Rourke 12/03/2008, Dazzle Ships re-release

1983 albums
Albums produced by Rhett Davies
Concept albums
Orchestral Manoeuvres in the Dark albums
Virgin Records albums